Michael Pasfield (born  1961) is an Australian former competitive figure skater. He won the Australian national title in the 1980–81 and 1981–82 seasons, representing New South Wales. He competed at three World Junior Championships, finishing twice in the top ten, and at two World Championships.

Pasfield began learning to skate in May 1970 in group lessons. His coaches included Jack Lee, Nita Solomon, Gretchen Black (Doolan), John Nicks, Gary Visconti, Terri Rudolf, Arthur Bourque, Ron Ludington and Ron Frank. He was a member of the Sydney Figure Skating Club.

He is the father and coach of 2012 Australian ladies champion Zara Pasfield (born 28 June 1995 in Sydney), and Katie Pasfield (born 25 August 1998 in Sydney), a two-time Australian national bronze medallist.

Competitive highlights

References 

1961 births
Australian male single skaters
Living people
Figure skaters from Sydney